Saab Bofors Dynamics is a subsidiary of the Saab Group that specializes in military materiel such as missile systems and anti-tank systems. It is located in Karlskoga and Linköping, Sweden.

Its corporate heritage goes back to Bofors, a hammer mill, which was founded as a royal state-owned company in 1646. In 1873, this was converted to a modern corporate structure by becoming an "stock company", in Swedish an aktiebolag, that is a "limited company" or a "corporation". In 1999, Saab purchased the Celsius Group, by that time the parent owner of Bofors. In September 2000, SAAB sold their Bofors Weapon Systems, which produced the autocannon and tube artillery weapons, to  United Defense Industries, while Saab retained their missile interests. Later BAE Systems acquired United Defense Industries.

The weapon systems include sensors based on radar, infrared, and lasers.

Several public campaigns, including civil disobedience actions, have targeted production sites as a protest against Swedish arms export.

Modern weapons systems
RBS 70 SAM system
RBS15 AShM/LAM system
Taurus missile Taurus KEPD 350
RBS 23 BAMSE SAM system
AT4/AT4 CS anti-tank weapon
Carl-Gustaf M3 (M3 MAAWS) 84 mm anti-tank weapon system
NLAW light anti-armor weapon
 STRIX 120 mm guided mortar round
 Saab Bofors Dynamics CBJ-MS 9 mm PDW
 Ak 5C 5.56mm carbine rifle, standard issue in the Swedish Armed Forces

References

External links
Saab Bofors Dynamics

Defence companies of Sweden
.
.
Manufacturing companies of Sweden
Aerospace companies of Sweden
Manufacturing companies established in 1999
Swedish companies established in 1999